Andipalayam is a census town in Tirupur district  in the state of Tamil Nadu, India.

Demographics
 India census, Andipalayam had a population of 5471. Males constitute 52% of the population and females 48%. Andipalayam has an average literacy rate of 66%, higher than the national average of 59.5%; with 58% of the males and 42% of females literate. 11% of the population is under 6 years of age.

References

Neighbourhoods and suburbs of Tiruppur